Olympia Aldersey (born 26 July 1992) is an Australian rower. She is an Australian national champion, a dual Olympian and is the current World Champion in the coxless four. In 2014 she set a world's fastest ever time (6:37.31) in a women's double scull over 2000m, a record which has stood since.  She rowed in the Australian women's eight at the Tokyo 2020 Olympics.

Personal
Aldersey was named Olympia by her parents as she was born during the 1992 Barcelona Olympic Games. In 2011, she graduated from St Peter's Girls School. She studied at the University of Adelaide, South Australia.

Club, youth and state rowing
Aldersey's senior rowing has been from the Adelaide Rowing Club.

She competed in the 2009 Australian Youth Olympic Festival where she won gold in the women's coxless pair and eight and silver in the coxless four.

Aldersley was first selected to represent South Australia at age seventeen in the women's youth eight in 2009 contesting the Bicentennial Cup at the Interstate Regatta within the Australian Rowing Championships. She made three further South Australian youth eight appearances in 2010, 2011 and 2012. In 2010 she also rowed in the South Australian senior women's eight competing for the Queen's Cup at the Interstate Regatta. South Australia didn't enter eights for the Queen's Cup in 2011 or 2012 but in 2014 she was back in the five seat of their senior women's eight and she raced six further Queen's Cups between 2014 and 2021.

Aldersey competed as South Australia's single scull representative racing for the Nell Slater Trophy in the Interstate Regatta in 2013, 2017, 2018 and 2019.

In 2017 in Adelaide Rowing Club colours she won the national double scull (with Madeleine Edmunds) and the quad scull titles at the Australian Rowing Championships.
 In 2021 in a National Training Centre eight she won the open women's eight title at the Australian Championships.

International representative rowing
Aldersley first represented Australia internationally in 2010 at the World Rowing Junior Championships in Racice, Czech Republic where she won a bronze medal rowing a double scull with fellow South Australian Emma Basher. They also won silver that year at the Youth Olympic Games in Singapore.

In July 2011 Aldersey competed at the World Rowing U23 Championships in Amsterdam and placed fourth in the final of the women's coxless pair

At the 2014 World Rowing Championships in Amsterdam Aldersey raced in Australia's double scull with Sally Kehoe. They finished third in the final and won the bronze medal. During the preliminary racing Kehoe and Aldersey set a world-record time for 2000m of 6:37.31. This record has stood since.

Aldersey was a member of the Australian women's eight who initially missed qualification for the 2016 Rio Olympics but received a late call up following the Russian drug scandal. WADA had discovered Russian state sponsored drug testing violations and the IOC acted to protect clean athletes and set strict entry guidelines for Russian athletes resulting in most of their rowers and nearly all of their crews being withdrawn from the Olympic regatta. The crew had dispersed two months earlier after their failure to qualify but reconvened, travelled at the last minute to Rio and borrowed a shell. They finished last in their heat, last in the repechage and were eliminated.

Aldersley continued to row at the highest world level into 2017 but moved into a double scull with Madeleine Edmunds. They contested two World Rowing Cups in Europe before winning a bronze at the 2017 World Rowing Championships in Sarasota, Florida. In 2018 at the World Rowing Cup II in Linz, Aldersey was in Australia's women's quad scull which placed third.

In 2019 Aldersey was picked in Australian women's sweep squad for the international season. In an effort to qualify the women's eight for the 2020 Olympics, selectors made some changes between the coxless four and the eight. Molly Goodman moved into the eight and Aldersey was selected at bow in the Australian women's coxless four. She rowed in that crew to a bronze medal at RWC II in Poznan and to a gold medal at WRC III in Rotterdam. Aldersey, Werry, Hawe and Stephan were selected to race Australia's coxless four at the 2019 World Rowing Championships in Linz, Austria. The four were looking for a top eight finish at the 2019 World Championships to qualify for the Tokyo Olympics. They won their heat and semi-final, thereby qualifying the boat for Tokyo 2020. They led the final from start to finish, took the gold medal and regained the coxless four world champion title. 

At the Tokyo 2020 Olympics the Australian women's eight were placed third in their heat, fourth in the repechage and fifth in the Olympic A final.  Had they managed to maintain their time of 5:57:15 that they achieved in their repechage they would have beaten the winners, Canada, by nearly two seconds and won the gold medal.

References

External links
 
 
 
 
 

1992 births
Living people
Australian female rowers
Rowers at the 2010 Summer Youth Olympics
Sportswomen from South Australia
Rowers from Adelaide
World Rowing Championships medalists for Australia
Rowers at the 2016 Summer Olympics
Olympic rowers of Australia
Rowers at the 2020 Summer Olympics
21st-century Australian women